Winifred Turner (1903-1983) was an English sculptor.

Biography
Turner was born in London, the daughter of the sculptor Alfred Turner. She studied at the Central School of Art and Design in London between 1921 and 1924, and then at Royal Academy Schools until 1929. She was elected a Fellow and Associate of the Royal Society of British Sculptors in 1930 and exhibited at the Royal Academy between 1924 and 1962. Turner taught at the Central School of Art in the 1930s and early 1940s.

References

1903 births
1983 deaths
20th-century British sculptors
20th-century English women artists
Alumni of the Central School of Art and Design
Alumni of the Royal Academy Schools
English women sculptors
Sculptors from London